JAMS, formerly known as Judicial Arbitration and Mediation Services, Inc. is a United States–based for-profit organization of alternative dispute resolution (ADR) services, including mediation and arbitration. H. Warren Knight, a former California Superior Court judge, founded JAMS in 1979 in Santa Ana, California.  A 1994 merger with Endispute of Washington, D.C. made JAMS into the largest private arbitration and mediation service in the country.  It is one of the major arbitration administration organizations in the United States.  As of 2017, JAMS has 27 resolution centers, including its headquarters in Irvine, California and centers in Toronto and London. JAMS specializes in mediating and arbitrating complex, multi-party, business/commercial cases.

 JAMS administers a few hundred consumer arbitration cases per year.  JAMS's Consumer Minimum Standards have been the subject of scholarly commentary.  A policy promulgated by JAMS in 2004 that would have allowed for class arbitrations, even if the arbitration agreement did not allow them, and the subsequent retraction of that policy, were also the subject of controversy.

JAMS Foundation

JAMS established the JAMS Foundation to offer financial assistance for conflict resolution initiatives with national or international impact and to share its dispute resolution experience and expertise for the benefit of the public interest. Funded entirely by contributions from JAMS neutrals and staff, the JAMS Foundation has provided nearly $5 million in grants for conflict resolution initiatives. The JAMS Foundation also established the Weinstein International Fellowship Program to provide opportunities for individuals from outside the United States to visit the U.S. and learn more about dispute resolution processes and practices and to pursue a project of their own to advance dispute resolution in their home countries. The Foundation, through the Warren Knight Award, has awarded $25,000 grants to programs dedicated to resolving conflict both in the US and around the world.

Notes

References

External links
 JAMS ADR official website
 JAMS International official website
 American Arbitration Association

Dispute resolution
Arbitration organizations